The Maulvi family, better known as the family of Jitu Miah, were a wealthy Bengali Muslim jagirdar family of Maulvis based in Sylhet. They played important religious and political roles in the history of Sylhet, Bengal and the subcontinent. Jitu Miah, the last jagirdar of the family, died in 1925 without leaving behind an heir. However the family estate managed by the local government, continued to be a prominent landmark in the town and a legacy of the family.

History
Maulvi Kalim Faruqi is generally considered to be the founder of the family. Faruqi was a student and successor (khalifah) of the 18th-century Urdu poet Mirza Mazhar Jan-e-Janaan of Delhi. Faruqi was considered to have been a scholar of hadith. Mawlana Azmi, author of a history book on Hadith in Bengal, peculiarly attributed the suffix Sylheti to Faruqi suggesting the family may have had connections with the Sylhet region this early on; either originating from there or inhabiting there.

Faruqi's grandson was Maulvi Abu Nasr Muhammad Idris Khan who was also a scholar of hadith. Idris moved to Sylhet during the Nawabi period to work as a Qadi and subjudge. Historian Achyut Charan Choudhury claims Idris migrated from Tipperah (Comilla), which is just south of Sylhet, where he and his forefathers lived. Idris was the Sadr-us Sudur of Bengal and wrote a sharh (commentary) on Al-Suyuti's Jamʿ al-Jawāmiʿ. Idris had two sons who were both authors and alims; Abu Muhammad Abdul Qadir and Maulana Abul Husayn Abdur Rahman Ziya (d. 1893).

Maulvi Abu Muhammad Abdul Qadir was a respected Mawlana, judge and celebrated polyglot writer. Some of Abdul Qadir's notable books include Ad-Durr al-Azhar fī Sharḥ al-Fiqh al-Akbar, Ar-Radd al-Maʾkūl ʿalā an-Nahj al-Maqbūl (a book opposing the Wahhabi Movement), Al-Fawaʾid al-Qādiriyyah fī Sharḥ al-ʿAqāʾid an-Nasafiyyah (Arabic) and Al-Jawāmiʿ al-Qādiriyyah fī Muʿtaqid Ahl as-Sunnah wa al-Jamāʿah (Arabic, c. 1818), Kashf al-Qādir fī Sharḥ al-Jāmiʿ as-Ṣaghīr (unpublished manuscript). He was praised by Siddiq Hasan Khan, a nawab of the Bhopal State for his works. The first editions of his books Tafsīr-i-Qādiriyyah (Persian) and Khulāṣah al-Masāʾil (Urdu, 1865) were in Kanpur and last editions circulated in 1969 by the Karachi Education Press. In 1886, he published the Urdu book Makhzan al-Irfān min Ṣunʾ is-Subḥān in Agra.

Khan Bahadur Maulvi Abu Nasr Muhammad Yahia, commonly known by his sobriquet Jitu Miah, was born in either 1848 or 1851 in the family home in Sheikghat, Sylhet. Yahia first started working as a sub-registrar under the British Raj. From 1897 to 1903, he was vice-chairman and honorary magistrate of the Sylhet Municipality (now Sylhet City Corporation). As part of the 1924 New Year Honours, King George V awarded Yahia with the First Class Kaisar-i-Hind Medal in St James's Palace for his public services in British India.

Yahia's first wife was his paternal first cousin, Sara Khatun. Sara died shortly after. Yahia later married the daughter of Khwaja Rasul Baksh of the Nawab family of Dhaka. She also died not long after and Yahia had no descendants. Yahia was said to have more wives later on from whom he had many children which he never publicly admitted. However, to preserve the existence of his estate, before his death in 1925, he made his estate a waqf with authorisation from the Government of Assam. The Sylhet District administrator became the mutawalli of the K B Yahia Waqf Estate. When Sylhet was upgraded to the divisional level, the mutawalli was the administrator of the Sylhet Division. He was said to have donated 60% of his wealth to social, religious and educational institutions and charities.

Estate
Abdul Qadir built the first family house in 1886 located in what is now the cow-haat of Kazir Bazar. The estate was damaged during and after the earthquake of 1897. In 1911, a two-storey Mughal-style building, made of limestone and powdered brick-dust, was built by his son, Yahia, in the front part of the estate, known as Yahia Villa. The ground floor acted as a drawing room and contains hand-calligraphy of the Quran and Hadith collected by Yahia. The entire floor has an area of 5523.959 square metres On top of the right side of this room is another room which contains a long black table and 20 chairs. This room acted as a meeting room. Many politicians, scholars and influential people visited, stayed in and were invited to the estate such as Mahatma Gandhi, Khwaja Salimullah, Fakhruddin Ali Ahmed, Muhammed Saadulah, Khwaja Nazimuddin, Abdul Hamid Khan Bhashani, Yusuf Ali Chowdhury, Hussain Ahmed Madani, Badshah Mian (descendant of Haji Shariatullah) and M. A. G. Osmani. The Government also gave rights for the possession of guns in the estate.

Legacy
Yahia became notable for his philanthropic works and the family estate became so famed during his time that it continues to be locally known today as Jitu Miyar Bari (Jitu Miah's house) and officially as Yahia Villa. A popular old poem about the Sylhet city mentions the house:  This translates to "The steps of Channighat, the beard of Bonku Babu, the house of Jitu Miah, and the clock of Ali Amzad", all of which are local landmarks.

Rajon Das later did some conservation work for the building. It was proposed in 2019 that this historical house be a place to conserve the culture and history of the region by making it the headquarters of the Department of Archaeology's Sylhet Divisional Archaeological Museum.

Eponyms
Yahia Villa, Sheikhghat, Sylhet
Jitu Miah's Point, Sheikhghat
Khan Bahadur Yahia General Hospital, Jitu Miah's Point
Khan Bahadur Yahia High School, Atukura, Habiganj District

See also
Mazumdars of Sylhet

References

People from Sylhet
Asian noble families
Bengali families
Bangladeshi families
Muslim families